Shamsuddin Togor ( – 23 July 2012) was a Bangladeshi film director.

Biography
Togor's first direction was Dosyu Bonhur. Anjana made her debut in the silver screen with this film.

Togor also directed films like Akheri Nishan and Banjaran. These films are selected for preservation in Bangladesh Film Archive.

Togor died on 23 July 2012 at the age of 68.

Selected filmography
Kar Bou (1966)
Dosyu Bonhur (1976)
Maheshkhalir Baanke (1978)
Akheri Nishan (1980)
Dokhol (1982)
Hur-e-Arab (1980)
Banjaran (1983)
Goli Theke Rajpoth (1983)
Somrat (1984)
Raj Bhikhari  (1985)
Nokol Shahzada (1985)
Soti Komola (1986)
Rotonmala

References

1940s births
2012 deaths
Bangladeshi film directors
People from Jessore District